Álvaro Robles (born 11 January 1989) is a Mexican professional boxer and is a former WBC FECARBOX welterweight Champion.

Professional career
In October 2010, Robles beat Rafael Ortiz by technical knockout to win the vacant WBC FECARBOX welterweight title.

References

External links

1986 births
Boxers from Baja California
Sportspeople from Mexicali
Welterweight boxers
Living people
Mexican male boxers